The South Africa national futsal team is controlled by the South African Football Association, the governing body for futsal in South Africa and represents the country in international futsal competitions.

Tournaments

FIFA Futsal World Cup
 1989 – Did not enter
 1992 – Did not enter
 1996 – Did not enter
 2000 – Did not qualify
 2004 – Did not qualify
 2008 – Did not qualify
 2012 – Did not qualify
 2016 – Did not qualify
 2020 – Withdrawn

Africa Futsal Cup of Nations
 1996 – Did not enter
 2000 – 4th place
 2004 – First round
 2008 – First round
 2011 – Cancelled
 2016 – First round (host)

References

External links
South Africa FA official website

South Africa
futsal
Futsal in South Africa